Investigation Discovery (abbreviated as ID) is a pay television channel available in several European nations. It competes in the same genre as Crime & Investigation Network which is also available in several European nations. The ID channel features crime programming, including "missing persons and murder inquiries, cold cases and historical crime," as well as documentaries on forensic investigations. One such program is Deadly Women, an investigative series in which former FBI agent and profiler Candice DeLong looks at female killers throughout history.

Its programming is mainly in English and locally subtitled or dubbed. In some countries, the advertisement and the announcements between programs are localized.

History
Investigation Discovery became available on cable television in the United States in January 2008. In Europe, the channel was first made available in the United Kingdom and Ireland.

Central and Eastern Europe
The channel launched in Poland, Romania, Hungary and Greece in April 2009, followed by Serbia, Slovenia, Croatia, Bosnia, and Montenegro in May 2009. On 28 June 2009 the channel replaced nTalk on the Polish platform N. On 15 July it replaced TVN Lingua on Cyfra+. In September 2009, it was announced that the channel would be added to RCS/RDS's offerings. The Baltic states followed in August 2009, when it launched on the Latvian Lattelecom platform.

Africa 
Since 2011, Investigation Discovery Africa launched on DStv channel 171, in October 2014, it was announced that Investigation Discovery will broadcast in HD.
In 2014, Investigation Discovery launched on Azam TV, StarTimes, Kwese TV and GOtv (since 2019). Investigation Discovery launched on Zuku TV on 16 November 2021, along with e.tv Africa and Africanews.

France
Since 15 December 2015, the channel is available exclusively to SFR TV subscribers, as a part of a deal between SFR and Discovery.

Netherlands and Flanders
Investigation Discovery replaced Discovery Travel & Living in the Netherlands and Flanders on 4 July 2011. An HD-simulcast started through Ziggo in the Netherlands on 8 February 2017.

Portugal
Investigation Discovery launched in Portugal on 2 October 2018 exclusively on NOS. The Portuguese feed has only local subtitles.

Sweden
Investigation Discovery had been broadcasting to Sweden since 2010, but was initially not widely available through major distributors. On 1 October 2014, it was added to the leading cable network Com Hem. It was added by satellite operator Canal Digital on 15 December. In January 2015, Discovery bought the terrestrial broadcasting license held by multicultural channel Kanal Global. That channel stopped broadcasting on 15 February 2015 and Investigation Discovery took over the license after that. The transaction was accepted by the Swedish Broadcasting Authority and the license is valid until 2020.

On 1 June 2015 a localized version launched in Sweden with content adapted for the Swedish market. The first original Swedish programme to air on the channel was Brottscentralen, a live crime show produced by Aftonbladet. Brottscentralen premiered on Investigation Discovery on 31 August 2015. During its first seven months on air, the channel achieved a 0.5 percent share of viewing and reached 1.8 percent of the population each week.

Availability

Cable
 CAI Harderwijk : Channel 136
 Caiway : Channel 26
 DELTA : Channel 30
 Kabel Noord : Channel 253
 NOS : Channel 74
 SFR : Channel 43
 Stichting Kabelnet Veendam : Channel 77
 Telenet : Channel 351  and Channel 341 
 Virgin Media : Channel 504
 Virgin Media : Channel 168 and Channel 173 (+1)
 YouSee : Channel 149
 Ziggo : Channel 123 (HD) and Channel 984 (SD)

IPTV
 BT TV : Channel 324
 eir Vision : Channel 131
 KPN : Channel 21
 Proximus TV : Channel 76  and Channel 326 
 Tele2 : Channel 23
 T-Mobile : Channel 65

Online
 Virgin TV Anywhere : VirginMediaTV.ie
 Virgin TV Anywhere : VirginMedia.com
 Ziggo GO : ZiggoGO.tv

Satellite
 DStv : Channel 171 (HD)
 Joyne : Channel 17
 OSN : Channel 505 (HD)
 Platforma Canal+ : Channel 147
 Sky : Channel 405
 Sky : Channel 154 and Channel 254 (+1)
Zuku TV (Kenya): Channel 417
AzamTV (Sub-Saharan Africa): Channel 200
StarTimes (Africa): Channel 223 (recently removed)

Terrestrial
 Digitenne : Channel 29
 GOtv (Sub-Saharan Africa): Channel 52

See also
 Investigation Discovery
 Crime & Investigation Network
 Discovery Channel

References

External links
 Netherlands 
 UK

Europe
Television channels in Belgium
Television stations in Denmark
Television channels in Flanders
Television stations in France
Television channels in the Netherlands
Television channels in Poland
Television channels in Sweden
Discovery Channel in the United Kingdom
Television channels and stations established in 2009
Warner Bros. Discovery EMEA